This is a list of vehicles manufactured by the American truck manufacturer Peterbilt since its 1939 founding.

Current

Retired (1980 to date)

Historic (before 1980) 
Before 1981, model designations started with 2 for single-drive (and tag axle) vehicles, and 3 for dual-drive vehicles.  This distinction gradually was phased out in the late 1970s.

Sleepers 
In the 1960s and 1970s, 30" and 36" sleepers were available. If a buyer wanted a larger sleeper, Peterbilt worked with Mercury Sleepers for 40", 60", and custom sized sleepers. Mercury would paint the sleeper to match the factory paint or the sleeper came with polished quilted aluminum. In 1978, Peterbilt's engineers were tasked with making a bigger sleeper. They designed the 63" sleeper with rounded doors and a walk-through from the cab. The sleeper debuted on a 359-127" and can be seen in the 1978 brochure "Best in Class". This truck also featured the first set of rectangular headlamps. The first raised roof (high cube) sleeper was on a 359 in 1986 and with changes (no right hand forward door) carried through to the 379 family. In 1994, the Unibilt sleeper debuted with air-ride suspension for the cab and sleeper with a large cab to sleeper opening. The Unibilt sleeper suspension had a one piece shock/air bag mount system from 1994 to 2006, until Peterbilt redesigned the suspension system for the 2007 model year, making the shock and air bag system on separate brackets. The Unibilt cab/sleeper option allowed for the sleeper to be removed for a daycab conversion. The UltraSleeper was Peterbilt's largest and most luxurious. At 70" long, it featured a right-hand access door, table, closet and a small "wet closet" accessible from the driver's side to store boots, gloves, and other 'damp' items. The last UltraSleeper was built in 2005

References

Lists of vehicles

Truck-related lists